A financial planner or personal financial planner is a qualified financial advisor. Practicing in full service personal finance, they advise clients on investments, insurance, tax, retirement and estate planning.

As a general rule, a financial planner’s work can:
 integrate into the range of professional services (eg: lawyer, accountant); or
 integrate into the offer of a range of financial products and services (eg: financial advisor, insurance agent); or
 not be integrated into other products or services, providing stand alone financial planning.

Scope 

Financial planning should cover all areas of the client's financial needs and should result in the achievement of each of the client's goals as required. The scope of planning would usually include the following:
 Risk management and insurance planning: managing cash flow risks through sound risk management and insurance techniques
 Investment and planning issues: planning, creating and managing capital accumulation to generate future capital and cash flows for reinvestment and spending, including managing for risk-adjusted returns and to deal with inflation
 Retirement planning: planning to ensure financial independence at retirement including 401Ks, IRAs etc.
 Tax planning: planning for the reduction of tax liabilities and the freeing-up of cash flows for other purposes
 Estate planning: planning for the creation, accumulation, conservation and distribution of assets
 Cash flow and liability management: maintaining and enhancing personal cash flows through debt and lifestyle management

Process 
The personal financial planning process is described in ISO 22222:2005 as consisting of six steps:

 Establishing and defining the client and personal financial planner relationship
 Gathering client data and determining goals and expectations
 Analysing and evaluating the client's financial status
 Developing and presenting the financial plan
 Implementing the financial planning recommendations
 Monitoring the financial plan and the financial planning relationship

Licensing, regulations and self-regulation 
In many countries, there are no requirements (no legal framework) regarding the use of the title of 'financial planner'.

The scope of the title "financial planner" varies from one jurisdiction to another. The legal framework of the profession may include:
 a reserved title (eg: PFA-certified financial planner, CFP, financial planner): the protection of the title ensures that the services are provided by accredited persons meeting ethical standards;
 reserved activities: as a general rule, the asset planning activity is shared between several professions;
 compulsory basic and continuing training: the training requirements of financial planners ensure updating of skills;
 professional liability insurance;
 a compensation fund;
 a supervised service offer;
 supervised instrumentation;
 an obligation of written mandate before delivering a professional service.

Australia
In Australia, financial advisors must be authorised under an Australian Financial Services licence holder to provide financial product advice. The licence holder must obtain a licence from the Australian Securities and Investments Commission (ASIC). The ASIC website states that "Holding an AFS licence does not provide a guarantee of the probity or quality of the licensee's services."

There has been recent reforms to the licensing of financial advisors in Australia as a result of several scandals involving things such as inadequate or improper advice and fees charged to clients for no service. From 1 January 2019, new education and training standards apply to financial advisers these standards include undertaking approved post graduate study, passing a national accredited examination and undertaking continuing professional education. New entrants to the industry have additional requirements.

Belgium 
In Belgium, advice in this area is regulated by the law of 25 April 25, 2014 relating to the status and control of independent financial planners and to the provision of planning consultations by regulated companies. Notaries, lawyers, accountants and auditors are however not targeted. The law uses the term "financial planning", which creates an amalgamation between two disciplines.

Canada 
In Canada, "financial planners" are unregulated in every province except Quebec, where only individuals holding the Planificateur Financier (Pl.Fin / F.Pl.) designation are allowed to use the title "Financial Planner" and offering financial planning services.

Outside of Quebec, there are currently no restrictions, no educational prerequisites, and no licensing requirements for individuals calling themselves financial planners, or for businesses using "financial planning" in their name or services offered. , Ontario and Saskatchewan have introduced legislation to regulate financial planning titles, but the legislation has yet to be enacted.

Many financial advisors in Canada call themselves financial planners yet only hold licences to sell personal financial products (primarily investments and insurance), or use non-expiring qualifications with no monitoring or public accountability process (such as the Personal Financial Planner / PFP designation). There are only two publicly monitored and fully regulated financial planning designations outside of Quebec the CFP (Certified Financial Planner) and the R.F.P. (Registered Financial Planner), designations.

The R.F.P. is the older (established in 1987) and more stringent of the two publicly monitored designations. All R.F.P.s must first demonstrate their competency, then abide by a code of ethics and adhere to rigorous practice standards as defined by the granting body, the Institute of Advanced Financial Planners (IAFP). Every R.F.P. must attest each year that financial planning is their primary vocation.

In Quebec

The title of financial planner (F.P.) or planificateur financier (Pl.Fin.) is a professional title used in Quebec (Canada). This Quebec title applies to a person who graduated from the Institut québécois de planification financière program and then supervised by a regulatory body authorized by provincial law: the Chambre de la sécurité financière, the Ordre des Administrateurs Agréés du Québec (in English: Order of Chartered Administrators of Quebec) or the Ordre professionnel des comptables professionnels agréés du Québec (in English: "Professional Order of Chartered Professional Accountants of Quebec"). At the end of his basic training, the “Financial Planner” (Pl.Fin.) is qualified to exercise the activity of “financial planning” of the asset type.

In addition, the Professional Orders participating in the supervision of the title of “Financial Planner” have developed more extensive practice models comprising all the components of asset administration. The generally recognized practice model of this profession normally excludes organizational-type financial planning (eg: companies, organizations, governments).

In the province of Quebec, this title is granted by the regulatory bodies that oversee this professional practice, namely the AMF (Autorité des marchés financiers) and the Participating professional orders: Ordre des Administrateurs Agréés du Québec and the Ordre professionnel des comptables professionnels agréés du Québec.

The Institut québécois de planification financière (Quebec Financial Planning Institute) (IQPF) is the only organization in Quebec authorized to award the diploma of "financial planner". The IQPF establishes the rules relating to basic training to gain access to the title of Financial Planner. In addition, the IQPF administers the AMF regulations on compulsory continuing education for financial planners subject to the AMF (Autorité des marchés financiers). In addition, the Professional Orders framing the Financial Planner title are responsible for the continuing education of their Pl.Fin members.

The Quebec title of "Financial Planner" (Pl.Fin.) Is the only one among the other homonymous titles in Canada which does not include an accreditation qualifier.

The Institut québécois de planification financière (IQPF) and the Financial Planning Standards Council (FPSC), the two organizations that oversee the profession of financial planner have developed the reference document Financial planning in Canada: definitions, standards and skills. This presents, among other things, the seven areas of intervention of financial planning, namely the legal aspects, insurance and risk management, finances, taxation, investments, retirement as well as estates.

India

Malaysia
The Securities Commission Malaysia introduced legislation through amendments made to the Securities Industry Act in 2003 to regulate financial planning and the use of the title or related-title of 'financial planner' or to conduct activities related to financial planning.

In 2005, amendments to the Malaysian Insurance Act require those who carry out financial advisory business (including financial planning activities related to insurance) and/or use the title of financial adviser under their firm (which, like in Singapore, must be a corporate structure) to obtain a license from Bank Negara Malaysia (BNM). Some persons who offer financial advisory services, e.g., licensed life insurance agents, are exempted from licensing as a practising requirement.

Singapore
In Singapore, financial services are highly regulated by The Monetary Authority of Singapore (MAS), the regulator and supervisor of financial institutions in Singapore. Rules are set by MAS for financial institutions and are implemented through legislation, regulations, directions and notices. Currently, the majority of the financial planners (financial consultants) are commission-based, which may cause a conflict of interest related to the products recommended. In 2015, a balanced scorecard framework was implemented to better align the interests of the FA industry and consumers. This ensures FA representatives and supervisors meet key performance indicators that are not related to sales, such as providing suitable product recommendations and making proper disclosure of material information to customers (Non-Sales KPI). Failure to achieve good grades for the Non-Sales KPI will directly affect their commission (variable income).

New Zealand
The Financial Markets Authority (FMA) (formerly the Securities Commission) provides Authorisation to individuals who provide Personalised Financial Advice, Investment Planning Services and/or Discretionary Investment Management Services. Individuals who receive authorisation are referred to as an Authorised Financial Adviser (AFA). In order to receive authorisation, individuals must complete the National Certificate in Financial Services (Financial Advice) (Level 5).

See also

References 

Finance occupations
Retail financial services
Financial planners